Ian Lorimer is a television director, most noted for being the director for the British panel game QI. He is also a director of Room 101.

Formerly a freelance vision mixer, Lorimer is well known in the British television industry for winning a court case against the Inland Revenue over his tax status as a freelancer, which served as a precedent for many other media workers.

External links
 .

Year of birth missing (living people)
British television directors
Living people
Place of birth missing (living people)